Benjamin B. Leas House, also known as Shirleysburg Female Seminary, Fort Shirley Site, and "The Rock," is a historic home located at Shirleysburg in Huntingdon County, Pennsylvania. It was built in 1850, and is a -story, rectangular red brick building, five-bays wide and measuring 41 feet by 32 feet. It has a rear kitchen / servant's quarters wing. The house is in the Greek Revival style. The house was built on the site of Fort Shirley, originally built in 1755. The house was used for a seminary from 1855 to 1866, as a rest-home for members of the German Baptist Church from 1885 to 1893, then housed the Shirleysburg Female Seminary until about 1903.

It was listed on the National Register of Historic Places in 1984.

References 

Houses on the National Register of Historic Places in Pennsylvania
Greek Revival houses in Pennsylvania
Houses completed in 1850
Houses in Huntingdon County, Pennsylvania
National Register of Historic Places in Huntingdon County, Pennsylvania